Emil Kotrba (22 February 1912 – 21 February 1983) was a Czech painter. His work was part of the painting event in the art competition at the 1948 Summer Olympics.

References

1912 births
1983 deaths
20th-century Czech painters
Czech male painters
Olympic competitors in art competitions
People from Znojmo
20th-century Czech male artists